Lysosomal-associated transmembrane protein 4B is a protein that in humans is encoded by the LAPTM4B gene.

LAPTM4B protein contains a lysosome localization motif and localizes on late endosomes and lysosomes.

Clinical significance 

Increased expression of LAPTM4B has been found in breast, liver, lung, ovarian, uterine, gastric cancers. Elevated LAPTM4B level contributes to chemotherapy resistance in breast cancer. Overexpression of LAPTM4B causes anthracyclines (doxorubicin, daunorubicin, and epirubicin) resistance by retaining drug in the cytoplasm and decreasing nuclear localization of drug and drug induced DNA damage.

LAPTM4B also promotes autophagy, a cell survival mechanism mediated by lysosomes. LAPTM4B promotes autophagy and renders tumor cells resistant to metabolic and genotoxic stress and results in more rapid tumor growth. Based on these findings, LAPTM4B can be utilized to be a therapeutic target to prevent chemotherapy resistance or a marker to identify the patients who will not benefit from anthracyclines.

LAPTM4B mediates pro-cancer functions through epidermal growth factor receptor (EGFR), a well-known oncogene overexpressed and/or mutated in many solid tumors. In nutrient rich conditions, LAPTM4B amplifies EGFR signaling by blocking the intraluminal sorting and lysosomal degradation of activated EGFR. In stressed conditions such as nutrient deprivation, LAPTM4B alternatively sequesters inactive EGFR at an endosomal complex that contributes to autophagy upregulation, a function independent of EGFR tyrosine kinase activity. LAPTM4B selectively interacts with inactive EGFR, which is markedly promoted by serum starvation. Thus, LAPTM4B not only augments proliferative signaling, but it also increases cellular stress resistance. These studies suggest that co-targeting EGFR with LAPTM4B or autophagy might improve therapeutic response in EGFR positive cancer patients.

References

Further reading